Holcocera crassicornella is a moth in the  family Blastobasidae. It is found in southern Florida.

The length of the forewings is 5.5–7.8 mm. The ground color of the forewings is greyish brown intermixed with pale-brown scales and a few brown scales. The hindwing dorsal and ventral surfaces have pale-brown scales basally, gradually darkening to the apex.

The larvae feed on the fruit of Eriobotrya japonica and have also been recorded on Acer rubrum.

References

Moths described in 1910
crassicornella